Late Pyar Hnaung Kyo is a Burmese horror drama television series. It was banned from watching series under the age of 13. It aired on MRTV-4, from November 21, 2019 to January 2, 2020, on Mondays to Fridays at 20:45 for 30 episodes.

Cast

Main
 Hein Htet as La Yake Htoo
 Mone as Tayar
 May Mi Ko Ko as Juri 
 Thi Ha as Oakkar

Supporting
 Wyne Shwe Yi as Kay Thi
 Khin Thaw Tar San as Mahaythi
 Wai Yan Kyaw as Naing Win 
 May Kabyar as Ma Ma Moe
 Pyay Zin as Ye Khaung
 Mya Hnin Yee Lwin as Daw May Kha

References

Burmese television series
MRTV (TV network) original programming